Fernando da Silva Cardozo (born 17 March 1979 in Pelotas) is a Brazilian footballer who plays for Brasil de Pelotas.

Club career
Cardozo previously played for Internacional and Juventude in the Campeonato Brasileiro Série A. He also enjoyed a successful spell at Nacional for five seasons before signing for cross-town rivals Marítimo in the summer of 2008. On 14 January 2010 announced his club Maritimo the 30-year-old center back will play on loan for Leixoes S.C. until the end of the season.

References

External links
 

1979 births
Living people
Brazilian expatriate footballers
Brazilian expatriate sportspeople in Portugal
Brazilian footballers
Association football defenders
Sport Club Internacional players
Esporte Clube Juventude players
C.D. Nacional players
C.S. Marítimo players
Primeira Liga players
Grêmio Esportivo Brasil players
Expatriate footballers in Portugal
People from Pelotas
Sportspeople from Rio Grande do Sul